The UEFA Super Cup is an annual association football match contested between the winners of the UEFA Champions League and the UEFA Europa League. Established in 1972, it was contested between the winners of the European Cup (renamed the UEFA Champions League in 1993) and the European/UEFA Cup Winners's Cup until 1999, when the latter was discontinued and merged with the UEFA Cup (renamed the Europa League in 2009) by UEFA. The last Super Cup contested in this format was the 1999 UEFA Super Cup between Lazio and Manchester United, which Lazio won 1–0. The competition was originally played over two legs, one at each participating club's stadium in the winter months, but since the 1998 edition, it consists of a single match played at a neutral venue in August. Between 1998 and 2012, the Stade Louis II in Monaco hosted the Super Cup, but since 2013, it has taken place every year at a different stadium across Europe.

Milan, Barcelona and Real Madrid share the record for the most victories, each having won the competition five times since its inception. Two of Milan's wins were achieved in consecutive years (1989 and 1990), which made them the first team to have retained the UEFA Super Cup. Real Madrid also won the competition in consecutive years in 2016 and 2017. Barcelona have the most appearances (nine), while Sevilla have the most runner-up finishes (five). Spanish teams have won the competition the most times, with sixteen wins, ahead of the nine wins each by both English and Italian teams. The current holders are the 2021–22 UEFA Champions League winners Real Madrid, who beat the 2021–22 UEFA Europa League winners Eintracht Frankfurt 2–0 in the 2022 edition.

Winners

The "Year" column refers to the year the Super Cup was held, and links to the article about that match.
The two-legged finals are listed in the order they were played.

Performances

By club

By nation

By method of qualification

See also
List of European Cup and UEFA Champions League finals
List of UEFA Cup and Europa League finals
List of UEFA Cup Winners' Cup finals
List of UEFA Intertoto Cup winners
List of UEFA Super Cup winning managers

Notes

References

External links
 UEFA Super Cup official history

UEFA Super Cup
UEFA Super Cup